The 2022 Melbourne Summer Set 2 was one of two tournaments of the Melbourne Summer Set. It was a WTA 250 tournament of the 2022 WTA Tour, and it was played on hardcourts. 

Amanda Anisimova won the women's singles title, her second career WTA title. Bernarda Pera and Kateřina Siniaková won the women's doubles title; with the win, Pera earned her first career WTA title.

Champions

Singles

  Amanda Anisimova def.  Aliaksandra Sasnovich 7–5, 1–6, 6–4

Doubles

  Bernarda Pera /  Kateřina Siniaková def.  Tereza Martincová /  Mayar Sherif 6–2, 6–7(7–9), [10–5]

Points and prize money

Point distribution

Prize money

*per team

WTA singles main.draw entrants

Seeds

 1 Rankings are as of 27 December 2021

Other entrants 
The following players received wildcards into the singles main draw:
  Ellen Perez
  Astra Sharma
  Samantha Stosur

The following players received entry from the qualifying draw:
  Harriet Dart
  Anna Kalinskaya
  Claire Liu
  Kamilla Rakhimova
  Aliaksandra Sasnovich
  Zhu Lin

The following player received entry as a lucky loser:
  Wang Xinyu

Withdrawals
Before the tournament
  Magda Linette → replaced by  Beatriz Haddad Maia
  Elise Mertens → replaced by  Wang Xinyu
  Anastasia Pavlyuchenkova → replaced by  Anna Karolína Schmiedlová
  Yulia Putintseva → replaced by  Varvara Gracheva
  Donna Vekić → replaced by  Amanda Anisimova

Retirements
  Anna Kalinskaya
  Clara Tauson

WTA doubles main-draw entrants

Seeds

 1 Rankings are as of 27 December 2021

Other entrants
The following pair received a wildcard into the doubles main draw:
  Alexandra Osborne /  Taylah Preston

The following pair received entry into the doubles main draw using a protected ranking:
  Monique Adamczak /  Han Xinyun

The following pair received entry into the doubles main draw as an alternate:
  Beatriz Haddad Maia /  Nuria Párrizas Díaz

Withdrawals
Before the tournament
  Aliona Bolsova /  Ankita Raina → replaced by  Aliona Bolsova /  Katarzyna Kawa
  Chan Hao-ching /  Monica Niculescu → replaced by  Nao Hibino /  Alicja Rosolska
  Anna Kalinskaya /  Marta Kostyuk → replaced by  Beatriz Haddad Maia /  Nuria Párrizas Díaz
  Anastasia Pavlyuchenkova /  Kateřina Siniaková → replaced by  Bernarda Pera /  Kateřina Siniaková
  Bernarda Pera /  Magda Linette → replaced by  Viktorija Golubic /  Astra Sharma

See also
 2022 Melbourne Summer Set 1

References

External links
 
 WTA tournament Official website

2022 WTA Tour
2022 in Australian tennis
January 2022 sports events in Australia
Melbourne Summer Set